Alexander Peya and Nicole Melichar were the defending champions, but Peya could not participate this year due to injury. Melichar played alongside Bruno Soares but lost in the quarterfinals to Yang Zhaoxuan and Matwé Middelkoop.

Ivan Dodig and Latisha Chan won the title, defeating Robert Lindstedt and Jeļena Ostapenko in the final, 6–2, 6–3.

This was the first Wimbledon to feature a final set tie-break. Upon reaching 12–12 in the third set, a classic tie-break would be played.

Seeds
All seeds received a bye into the second round.

Draw

Finals

Top half

Section 1

Section 2

Bottom half

Section 3

Section 4

External links
 Draw
2019 Wimbledon Championships – Doubles draws and results at the International Tennis Federation

X=Mixed Doubles
2019